Aşağıfındıklı can refer to:

 Aşağıfındıklı, İspir
 Aşağıfındıklı, Sungurlu